Arno was a department of the First French Empire in present-day Italy. It was named after the Arno river. It was formed in 1808, when the Kingdom of Etruria (formerly the Grand Duchy of Tuscany) was annexed directly to France. Its capital was Florence.

The department was disbanded after the defeat of Napoleon in 1814. At the Congress of Vienna, the Grand Duchy of Tuscany was restored to its previous Habsburg-Lorraine prince, Ferdinand III. Its territory is now divided between the Italian provinces of Florence, Prato, Arezzo, Pistoia and Forlì-Cesena.

Subdivisions
The department was subdivided into the following arrondissements and cantons (situation in 1812):

 Florence, cantons: Florence (6 cantons), Bagno a Ripoli, Barberino di Mugello, Borgo San Lorenzo, Campi, San Casciano, Dicomano, Empoli, Fiesole, Galluzzo, Greve, Lastra, Montelupo, Montespertoli, Pontassieve, Reggello, Scarperia, Sesto and Tavarnelle.
 Arezzo, cantons: Arezzo (2 cantons), Anghiari, Bibbiena, Borgo Santo Sepolcro, Castel Focognano, Castel San Niccolò, Castiglion Fiorentino, Civitella, Cortona, Figline, Foiano, Lucignano, Monte San Savino, Montevarchi, Pieve Santo Stefano, Poppi, Pratovecchio, San Giovanni and Terranuova.
 Modigliana (created from part of the arrondissement of Florence in 1811), cantons: Modigliana, Bagno, Firenzuola, Galeata, Marradi, Rocca San Casciano and Sestino.
 Pistoia, cantons: Pistoia, Montale, Porta al Borgo, Porta San Marco, Prato-ville, Prato-contado, San Marcello, Sambuca, Serravalle and Tizzana.

Its population in 1812 was 584,475, and its area was 807,475 hectares.

References

See also
History of Tuscany
List of historic states of Italy
Rulers of Tuscany

Former departments of France in Italy
History of Florence
History of Tuscany
Arezzo
1808 establishments in the First French Empire
1808 establishments in Italy
1814 disestablishments in Italy
1800s in the Grand Duchy of Tuscany
1810s in the Grand Duchy of Tuscany